Missouri Executive Order 44, commonly known as the Mormon Extermination Order, was an executive order issued on October 27, 1838, by the then Governor of Missouri, Lilburn Boggs.  The order was issued in the aftermath of the Battle of Crooked River, a clash between Mormons and a unit of the Missouri State Militia in northern Ray County, Missouri, during the 1838 Mormon War. Claiming that the Mormons had committed open and avowed defiance of the law and had made war upon the people of Missouri, Governor Boggs directed that "the Mormons must be treated as enemies, and must be exterminated or driven from the State if necessary for the public peace—their outrages are beyond all description".  The Militia and other state authorities—General John B. Clark, among them—used the executive order to violently expel the Mormons from their lands in the state following their capitulation, which in turn led to their forced migration to Nauvoo, Illinois. 

The order was supported by most northwest Missouri citizens but was questioned or denounced by a few. However, no determination of the order's legality was ever made. On June 25, 1976, Governor Kit Bond issued an executive order rescinding the Extermination Order, recognizing its legal invalidity and formally apologizing on behalf of the State of Missouri for the suffering it had caused the Mormons.

Text of the order

Missouri Executive Order Number 44 reads as follows:

Background

Executive Order 44 was issued during the 1838 Mormon War, which was caused by friction between the Mormons and their neighbors due to the economic and electoral growth of the Latter-day Saint community. The religious and political views of the Mormons did not sit well with the non-Mormon citizens of the state.  Tensions had been steadily rising due to 1833 newspaper articles written in Independence, Missouri, which culminated in a manifesto published by many Missouri public officials:

We, the undersigned, citizens Jackson County, believing that an important crisis is at hand, as regards our civil society, in consequence of a pretended religious sect of people that have settled, and are still settling in our County, styling themselves Mormons; and intending, as we do, to rid our society, "peaceably if we can, forcibly if we must," and believing as we do, that the arm of the civil law does not afford us a guarantee, or at least a sufficient one against the evils which are now inflicted upon us, and seem to be increasing, by the said religious sect, deem it expedient, and of the highest importance, to form ourselves into a company for the better and easier accomplishment of our purpose—a purpose which we deem it almost superfluous to say, is justified as well by the law of nature, as by the law of self-preservation.

It is more than two years since the first of these fanatics, or knaves, (for one or the other they undoubtedly are) made their first appearance among us, and pretended as they did, and now do, to hold personal communication and converse face-to-face with the Most High God; to receive communications and revelations direct from heaven; to heal the sick by laying on hands; and, in short, to perform all the wonder-working miracles wrought by the inspired Apostles and Prophets of old.

We believed them deluded fanatics, or weak and designing knaves, and that they and their pretensions would soon pass away; but in this we were deceived. The arts of a few designing leaders amongst them have thus far succeeded in holding to them together as a society; and since the arrival of the first of them, they have been daily increasing in numbers; and if they had been respectable citizens in society and thus deluded they would have been entitled to our pity rather than to our contempt and hatred; but from their appearance, from their manners, and from their conduct since their coming among us, we have every reason to fear that, with but very few exceptions, they were of the very dregs of that society from which they came, lazy, idle, and vicious. This we can see it is not idle assertion, they fact susceptible of proof, or with these few exceptions above-named, they brought into our country little or no property with them and left less behind them, and we infer that those only yoked themselves to the "Mormon" car who had nothing earthly or heavenly to lose by the monad; and we fear that if some of the leaders amongst them, had paid the forfeit due to crime, instead of being chosen ambassadors of the Most High, they would have been inmates of solitary cells. But their conduct here stamps their characters in their true colors. More than a year since, it was ascertained that they had been tampering with our slaves, and endeavoring to sow dissensions and raise seditions amongst them. Of this their "Mormon" leaders were informed, and they said they would deal with any of their members who should again in like case offend. But how spacious are appearances. In a late number of the Star, published in Independence by the leaders of the sect, there is an article inviting free Negroes and mulattoes from other states to become "Mormons," and remove and settle among us. This exhibits them in still more odious colors. It manifests a desire on the part of their society, to inflict on our society an injury that they know would be to us entirely insupportable, and one of the surest means of driving us from the country; for it would require none of the supernatural gifts that they pretend to, to see that the introduction of such a caste among us would corrupt our blacks, and instigate them to bloodshed.

They openly blaspheme the Most High God, and cast contempt on His holy religion, by pretending to receive revelations direct from heaven, by pretending to speak unknown tongues, by direct inspiration, and by diverse pretenses derogatory to God and religion, and to the utter subversion of human reason.

They declare openly that their God hath given them this county of land, and that sooner or later they must and will have possession of our lands for inheritance; and, in fine, they have conducted themselves on many other occasions, and such a manner, that we believe it a duty we owe to ourselves, our wives, and children, to the cause of public morals, to remove them from among us, as we are not prepared to give up our pleasant places and goodly possessions to them or to receive into the bosom of our families, as fit companions for wives and daughters, the degraded and corrupted free Negroes and mulattos that are now invited to settle among us.

Under such a state of things, even our beautiful county would cease to be a desirable residence, and our situation intolerable! We, therefore agree (that after timely warning, and receiving an adequate compensation for what little property they cannot take with them, they refuse to leave us in peace, as they found us—we agree to use such means as may be sufficient to remove them, and to that and we each pledge to each other our bodily powers, our lives, fortunes and sacred honors.

We will meet at the courthouse, at the town of Independence, on Saturday next, the 20th inst., [July], to consult on subsequent movements.

Among the hundreds of names attached to the document were:

Louis Franklin, jailer
Samuel C. Owens, County Clerk
Russel Hicks, Deputy County Clerk
R.W. Cummins, Indian agent
James H. Flournoy, Postmaster
S.D. Lucas, Colonel and judge of the court
Henry Chiles, attorney-at-law
N.K. Olmstead, M.D.
John Smith, justice in peace
Samuel Westin, justice of the peace
William Brown, Constable
Abner F. Staples, Captain
Thomas Pitcher, Deputy Constable
Moses G. Wilson and Thomas Wilson, merchants

On the same day, July 20, 1833, the W. W. Phelps printing press, which published the Evening and the Morning Star in Independence, was destroyed by a mob.

The destruction was also in retaliation for the publication of portions of the Joseph Smith Translation of the Bible, particularly that of the book of Genesis, in the Evening and the Morning Star in August 1832 and in March and April 1833.

Early July 1833, the Star announced: "At no very distant period, we shall print the book of Mormon and the [New] Testament, and bind them in one volume." However, hopes for this were postponed when the printing press in Independence was destroyed.

The 1838 Mormon War ended with the expulsion of nearly all Mormons from the state of Missouri.

Executive Order 44 is often referred to as the "Extermination Order" due to the phrasing used by Governor Boggs.

The Mormons had been given a county of their own (Caldwell County) in 1836, following their expulsion from Jackson County in 1833. However, the increasing influx of new Mormon converts moving to northwestern Missouri led them to begin settling in adjacent counties. Other settlers, who had operated under the assumption that the Mormons would remain confined to Caldwell County, became angry due to these new settlements.

On July 4, 1838, church leader Sidney Rigdon delivered an oration in Far West, the county seat of Caldwell County.  While not desiring or intending to start any trouble with his Christian neighbors, Rigdon wanted to make clear that the Mormons would meet any attacks on them—such as had already occurred in Jackson County during the summer and fall of 1833, resulting in their forced expulsion from their homes in that locale—with force:

Far from settling tensions, Rigdon's oration had the opposite effect: it terrified and inflamed the residents of surrounding counties. By the fall of that same year these tensions escalated into open conflict, culminating in the looting and burning of several Mormon farms and homes, the sacking and burning of Gallatin by the "Danites", and the taking of hostages by Cpt. Samuel Bogart and his militia, operating in northern Ray County (to the south of Caldwell). When the Mormon armed mob from the town of Far West moved south to the militia camp on the Crooked River, causing rumors of a planned full-scale invasion of Missouri that ran rampant throughout the summer and aroused terror throughout the western part of the state. These rumors only increased as reports of the Battle of Crooked River reached the capital at Jefferson City, with accounts of Mormons allegedly slaughtering Bogart's militia company, including those who had surrendered.  Further dispatches spoke of an impending attack on Richmond, county seat of Ray County, though in fact no such attack was ever contemplated.  After hearing these reports Governor Boggs chose to act.

Previously, Governor Boggs had received word that Mormons had driven several citizens of Daviess County (north of Caldwell) from their homes.  He had then appointed General John Bullock Clark to lead the State Militia in assisting those citizens to return.  But after hearing these reports, Governor Boggs issued new orders directing Clark to commence direct military operations and issued Missouri Executive Order 44.

Deaths
General Clark cited Executive Order 44 soon after the Mormon settlers, mostly unarmed and poor immigrants, surrendered in November 1838, saying that violence would have been used had they chosen not to surrender.  Clark furthermore stated,

The Mormons had every reason to believe this threat, considering recent activities involving other members of the state militia. Therefore, 15,000 Mormons immediately fled for Illinois, in harsh winter conditions.  Even still, the question of whether anyone was killed as a direct result of the Extermination Order between October 27 (the date of its issuance) and November 1, 1838 (the date of the Latter-day Saint surrender), has been hotly debated among Mormons and historians.  Most historians state that there is no evidence of any militiamen or other participants using it to justify their behavior during that period.

Haun's Mill

Many people connect Governor Boggs' order directly to the Haun's Mill massacre on October 30, 1838.  At least one firsthand account asserts local Guardsmen referred to an order issued by the governor that sounds similar to Order 44 as justification for the Haun's Mill massacre.  The Haun's Mill massacre was launched by Missouri State Guardsmen from Livingston County on the settlement of Haun's Mill, located in eastern Caldwell County near the Livingston County line, which resulted in the deaths of 18 men and boys, some of whom were murdered after surrendering.

Others state there is no evidence that the militiamen knew of the Executive Order, and participants in this massacre who spoke of it later never used Governor Boggs' decree to justify their actions.  They instead indicate that unnamed Mormon dissenters had told them that the people of Haun's Mill were planning to invade Livingston County.  The question of whether the militiamen knew in advance of Boggs' order is still hotly debated today.

A little less debatable is the question of the murder of defenseless, unarmed men and boys.

Aligning with the firsthand statements regarding having been stripped of all weapons prior to the attack is the lack of casualties or injuries inflicted upon the attackers.  In addition, orders explicitly stated the Mormons were to have their weapons removed.

Financial losses
To date, there have been no reparations or other financial compensation for losses by either side in the conflict. Historian William Alexander Linn wrote: 

To put the dollar numbers in modern context: $1,000,000 in 1838 equals $31,913,655.91  in 2023.

Aftermath

Although the Mormon leaders surrendered at Far West on November 1, Mormons (especially in outlying areas) continued to be subject to harassment and even forced ejection by citizens and Militia units.  The Mormons in Caldwell County, as part of their surrender agreement, signed over all of their property to pay the expenses of the campaign against them; although this act was later held unlawful, it became clear to them that departure from the state was the only option state officials were going to allow.

Upon his arrival at Far West, General Clark delivered the following speech to the now-captive Mormons, in which he directly invoked Order 44:

Though Clark had offered to allow the Mormons to remain in Missouri until the following spring, they decided to leave right away; according to one account, most had departed within ten days of Clark's speech.  Although Governor Boggs belatedly ordered a militia unit under Colonel Sterling Price (later to achieve fame as a Confederate Civil War general) to northern Missouri to stop ongoing depredations against the Mormons, he refused to repeal Order #44.  The Missouri legislature deferred discussion of an appeal by Mormon leaders to rescind the decree. Nearly all of the approximately 10,000 Mormons left Missouri by the spring of 1839, and would not begin to return to Missouri until approximately 25 years later.

Governor Boggs himself was excoriated in Mormon portions of the Missouri press, as well as those of neighboring states, for his action in issuing this order. General David Atchison, a legislator and militia general from western Missouri who had refused to take part in operations, demanded that the Legislature formally state its opinion of Governor Boggs' order, for "he would not live in any state, where such authority was given".  Although his proposal and similar ones by others went down to defeat, Governor Boggs himself saw his once-promising political career destroyed to the point that, by the next election, his own party was reluctant to be associated with him.  After surviving an assassination attempt in 1842, Governor Boggs ultimately emigrated to California, where he died in relative obscurity in the Napa Valley in 1860.

Rescission

In late 1975, President Lyman F. Edwards of the Far West stake of the Reorganized Church of Jesus Christ of Latter Day Saints, invited then Missouri Governor Kit Bond to participate in the June 25, 1976, stake's annual conference as a good-will gesture for the United States Bicentennial.  As part of his address at that conference, 137 years after being signed and citing the unconstitutional nature of Governor Boggs' directive, Governor Bond presented the following Executive Order:

See also

Latter Day Saint martyrs
Mormon Exodus (1846–1857)
Pogrom

Notes

References

.

.

,  T, New York, 1877, p. 117

Further reading

External links

Mormon War Letters, the battle correspondence leading up to, and including, the Extermination Order - presented by LDS historian Mel Tungate.
The Missouri Mormon War Executive Orders include both the original Executive Order 44 and the rescinding order as PDFs - presented by the Missouri Secretary of State.
Lilburn W. Boggs letter to Joseph Hawkins, Vault MSS 724, L. Tom Perry Special Collections, Harold B. Lee Library, Brigham Young University

1838 Mormon War
Christianity and law in the 19th century
Latter Day Saint terms
Mormonism and law
Mormonism-related controversies
Legal history of Missouri
Religious expulsion orders
1838 documents